Banwar (Devanagari: बनवार Banwár) is a village in Bhitarwar block of Gwalior district, in Madhya Pradesh, India. As of 2011, the village population is 4,209, in 769 households. There is a weekly haat, but no mandi/regular market.

History 
At the beginning of the 20th century, Banwar was part of Gwalior State. Located in Pichhore pargana of zila Gird Gwalior, it had a population of 1,253 and an area of 8,631 bighas. The village had a school and a Sayar Naka.

References 

Villages in Gwalior district